K. Ramachandran (born 9 August 1951) is an Indian politician and the Minister for Forests in Tamil Nadu. He was born in Coonoor.

He was elected to the Tamil Nadu Legislative Assembly as a Dravida Munnetra Kazhagam(DMK) candidate from Gudalur constituency in 2006 and from Coonoor constituency in 2011 and 2021.

He also served as the Minister for Khadi of Tamil Nadu from 2006-2011 in the Cabinet of Dr.M. Karunanidhi.

The Coonoor seat had long been held by the DMK but supporters of Ramachandran were incensed that he was deselected for the 2016 elections and threatened to rebel. The new candidate was B. M. Mubarak, who had also been given the post of district secretary of the party in Nilgiris after Ramachandran had been removed from it in 2014. The DMK lost the seat.

References 

Dravida Munnetra Kazhagam politicians
State cabinet ministers of Tamil Nadu
Living people
1951 births
Tamil Nadu MLAs 2001–2006
Tamil Nadu MLAs 2006–2011
People from Coonoor
Tamil Nadu MLAs 2021–2026